Batlug is a village in the municipality of Gračišće in Istria, Croatia.

According to the 2001 Croatian census, the village had 142 inhabitants and 42 family households.

References

Populated places in Istria County